Palihakkara may refer to 
Shesha Palihakkara , Sri Lankan dancer and actor.
Sahan Palihakkara ,Sri Lankan cricketer.
H. M. G. S. Palihakkara ,Sri Lankan diplomat and civil servant.